Kolt is a south-western suburb of Aarhus in Denmark. It is located about 9 km from the city centre.

Kolt has largely merged with neighbouring area Hasselager in modern times, and the two are collectively known and referred to as Kolt-Hasselager, with shared postal code 8361. The area is predominantly residential, but with a large industrial park as well.

References

Sources 
Ormslev Kolt Lokalhistoriske samling: Kolt, archives on local history

External links 

Neighborhoods of Aarhus